Songea Rural District is one of five districts in the Ruvuma Region of Tanzania. It is bordered to the north by the Morogoro Region, to the east by the Namtumbo District, to the south by the Songea Urban District, to the west by the Mbinga District and to the Northwest by the Iringa Region.

According to the 2002 Tanzania National Census, the population of the Songea Rural District was 147,924.

Sources
 Ruvuma Region Homepage for the 2002 Tanzania National Census

Districts of Ruvuma Region